AWF (or Agent.AWF) is a malicious Trojan downloader affecting the Microsoft Windows operating system.

Methods of infection
This Trojan is considered obsolete, and there are no known variants in the wild.

Affected operating systems
The following operating systems are known to be affected.

 Windows XP
 Windows 2003
 Windows 2000
 Windows ME
 Windows 98
 Windows 95
 Windows NT

Operation
Agent.AWF displays virus activity in that it replaces files on a user's computer with a copy of itself, and moves the original, legitimate file to a back sub-folder. It is known to attempt to terminate security software, and the Trojan downloads a backdoor onto the computer, allowing the attacker to further compromise the computer. It is also known to modify the Windows registry. Agent.AWF does not spread automatically: it needs an attacking user's intervention in order to reach the affected computer. The means of transmission used include, among others, floppy disks, CD-ROMs, emails with attached files, Internet downloads, FTP, IRC channels, peer-to-peer (P2P) file sharing networks, etc.

Identification
During installation, the following files are created, and may be present on a compromised system.

 abc123.pid
 svcipa.exe
 nod32kui.exe

References

Windows trojans